Century Allen "Wally" Milstead (January 1, 1901 – June 2, 1963) was a collegiate and professional American football player.  He played college football at Wabash College and at Yale University, where his play earned him All-America recognition.  Milstead went on to play with the professional Philadelphia Quakers of the American Football League and the New York Giants of the National Football League (NFL).  He got his name for being born on the first day of the twentieth century, January 1, 1901.  Milstead was inducted into the College Football Hall of Fame in 1977.

References

External links

 
 

1901 births
1963 deaths
American football tackles
New York Giants players
Philadelphia Quakers (AFL) players
Wabash Little Giants football players
Yale Bulldogs football players
College Football Hall of Fame inductees
Sportspeople from Rock Island, Illinois
Players of American football from Illinois
People from Pleasantville, New York
Players of American football from Pittsburgh